Opisthotropis voquyi, Vo Quy's mountain stream keelback,  is a species of natricine snake found in Vietnam.

References

Opisthotropis
Reptiles described in 2018
Reptiles of Vietnam